Bertolazzi is an Italian surname. Notable people with the surname include:

Alessandro Bertolazzi (born 1958), Italian makeup artist 
Angelo Bertolazzi (1896–1963), Italian sculptor

See also
FBI – Francesco Bertolazzi investigatore

Italian-language surnames